Kenya Coalition may refer to:
Kenya Coalition, a political party in Kenya
Black-red-green coalition, a term in German politics